Ancestry in Progress is an album by Zap Mama, released in 2004. Marie Daulne, Zap Mama's leader, deemed the music "Afropean".

The album peaked at No. 1 on Billboard'''s World Albums chart.

Production
The album was mostly recorded in Philadelphia, where Daulne worked with musicians associated with the Roots. It contains contributions from  Talib Kweli, Erykah Badu, Questlove, Bahamadia, and Common. Daulne sings in French and English, while also employing chants from Pygmy music.

Critical receptionExclaim! thought that "'Bandy Bandy', with Erykah Badu, stands out because of its polished immediacy." The Baltimore Sun determined that "Daulne blends the ancient (her trademark pygmy onomatopoeic vocal techniques and chants) with the present (smoothed- out, atmospheric grooves)."The New York Times concluded: "Half of the album comes across simply as neo-soul with a Belgian accent. But the other half—especially 'Show Me the Way'—meshes Zap Mama's dizzying, ping-ponging vocal polyphony with pithy hip-hop beats and a pan-African assortment of guitar curlicues." The Sydney Morning Herald opined: "Singing in both French and English, she's a breathy African Bjork one minute, an operatic Afro-funk diva the next." Rolling Stone'' considered that "despite rap cameos and world-beat sound effects, the grooves are as bland as bad neosoul, and the songs sound like bundles of self-consciously eclectic singing."

AllMusic wrote that "this is far more an urban recording, where urban pop and nu-soul are informed by worldbeat esthetics rather than the other way around."

Track listing
Intro 
Sweet Melody 
Vivre 
Bandy Bandy 
Yelling Away 
Show Me the Way 
Follow Me 
Miss Q'N 
Yaku 
Ca Varie Varie 
Alright 
Cache Cache 
LeÇon N°5 
Wadidyusay? 
Zap Bébés

References

2004 albums
Luaka Bop albums